The Star is a  one-design racing keelboat for two people designed by Francis Sweisguth in 1910. The Star was an Olympic keelboat class from 1932 through to 2012, the last year keelboats appeared at the Summer Olympics.

It is sloop-rigged, with a mainsail larger in proportional size than any other boat of its length. Unlike most modern racing boats, it does not use a spinnaker when sailing downwind. Instead, when running downwind a whisker pole is used to hold the jib out to windward for correct wind flow. Early Stars were built from wood, but modern boats are generally made of fiberglass.
The Star class pioneered an unusual circular boom vang track, which allows the vang to effectively hold the boom down even when the boom is turned far outboard on a downwind run. Another notable aspect of Star sailing is the extreme hiking position adopted by the crew and at times the helmsman, who normally use a harness to help hang low off the windward side of the boat with only their lower legs inside.

History

The Star was designed in 1910 by Francis Sweisguth, a draftsman at the William Gardner Marine Architect office. Over the course of his career Sweisguth designed a variety of yachts. A more traditional example of his work is Silent Maid, a Barnegat Bay B-class catboat designed shortly after the Star. The first 22 stars were built in Port Washington, New York by Ike Smith during the winter of 1910–11. Since that time, over 8,400 boats have been built, with more than 2,000 actively racing in 170 fleets.

The hull is a hard chine design with a slight curve to the bottom section, and a bulb keel. The Star was originally rigged with a large, low-aspect-ratio gunter mainsail and jib, which was replaced by a short bermuda rig gradually during the early 1920s, before the current tall bermuda sail plan was adopted in 1930. In 1965, fiberglass replaced wood as the primary hull material. Other changes to the strict design rules for the Star class, include adding flexible spars, an innovative circular-track boom vang, and self-bailers.

Events

Olympics 
The Star was added to the Olympic roster for the 1932 Summer Olympics in Los Angeles. Due to World War II, there were no Olympic games held in 1940 or 1944, and for 1976, the Star was replaced by the Tempest for keelboat competition. In 2011 keelboats were removed from sailing at the 2016 Summer Olympics in Rio de Janeiro. The last keelboat Olympics competition was at the 2012 London Summer Olympics.

World Championships 

The Star World Championships has been held annually since 1923. Most titles has American sailor Lowell North won, with five titles between 1945 and 1973 and another seven podiums. The most crowned skipper-crew combination is Italian duo Agostino Straulino and Nicolò Rode and Brazilian duo Robert Scheidt and Bruno Prada with three titles each. Also, American Mark Reynolds has three titles, but with different crew.

Star Sailors League 
The Star Sailors League was created in 2013 by athletes to establish a sustainable sailing circuit.

Famous Star sailors 
 Ralph Craig (Olympic 100 and 200 meter Champion: 1912)
 Duarte Bello (Championship competitor, 1947–1970s. Invented auto-bailers and circular boom-vang track)
 John F. Kennedy (Nantucket Sound Star Class Championship: 1936)
 Agostino Straulino (Olympic Champion: 1952; World Champion: 1952, 1953, 1956; Olympic Silver: 1956)
 Robert Halperin (Olympic Bronze: 1960; Pan American Games Gold: 1963)
 Paul Elvstrøm (World Champion: 1966, 1967)
 Dennis Conner (World Champion: 1971, 1977)
 Buddy Melges (World Champion: 1978, 1979)
 Iain Percy (Olympic Champion: 2008; World Champion: 2010; Olympic Silver: 2012)
 Robert Scheidt (Olympic Silver: 2008; Olympic Bronze: 2012; World Champion: 2008, 2011, 2012; SSL Finals: 2013)
 Fredrik Lööf (World Champion: 2001, 2004; Olympic Champion: 2012)

See also
Comet (dinghy), a smaller and more easily transported sailboat, based upon the Star design

References

External links 

 International Star Class Yacht Racing Association (ISCYRA)
 International Star Class at the International Sailing Federation (ISAF)
 International Star Class in "Classic Classes" at Classic Boat magazine
 THe Star 45 Class at the American Model Yachting Association (AMYA)

 
Keelboats
Olympic sailing classes
1910s sailboat type designs
Sailboat type designs by Francis Sweisguth
Sailboat types built by Clark Boat Company
One-design sailing classes